Stegmann is a German surname. Notable people with the surname include:

 Boris K. Stegmann (1898–1975), Russian ornithologist
 Carl David Stegmann (1751–1826), German tenor
 Matthias von Stegmann (born 1968), German voice-over artist and operatic stage director
 Miep Stegmann (1927-1985), Belgian psychologist
 Niklas Stegmann (born 1987), German footballer
 Povl Stegmann (1888–1944), Danish architect
 Seb Stegmann  (born 1989), English rugby player

German-language surnames